The  is a yakuza organization based in Chiba, Japan. The Soai-kai is a designated yakuza group with an estimated 120 active members.

History
The Soai-kai was formed in 1945 by Toramatsu Takahashi, then a member of a Yokohama-based bakuto group named the Sasada-ikka.

Condition
Headquartered in Ichihara, Chiba, the Soai-kai is one of the three dominating yakuza groups in Chiba Prefecture, along with the Sumiyoshi-kai and the Inagawa-kai.

References

Organizations established in 1945
1945 establishments in Japan
Yakuza groups